2020 Belarusian First League is the 30th season of 2nd level football in Belarus. It started in April and finished in November 2020.

Team changes from 2019 season
Two best teams of 2019 Belarusian First League (Belshina Bobruisk and Smolevichi), as well as third-placed Rukh Brest (who won the promotion/relegation play-off) were promoted to Belarusian Premier League. They were replaced by 15th-placed teams of 2019 Belarusian Premier League (Gomel) and 14th-placed Dnyapro Mogilev (who lost the play-off to Rukh Brest). 16th-placed Premier League team Torpedo Minsk disbanded, leaving a vacancy in the First League.

Last placed team of the last season (Baranovichi) relegated to the Second League. They were replaced by two best teams of 2019 Second League (Arsenal Dzerzhinsk and Oshmyany).

NFK Minsk reverted their name to Krumkachy Minsk during the winter break.

Dnyapro Mogilev ceased to exist in the spring. To fill in two vacant spots left by Dnyapro and Torpedo and to return to 16 participants, two teams were additionally promoted (Molodechno and Underdog Chist as the 3rd- and 4th-placed Second League teams). However, as both clubs represent neighboring cities, Molodechno were unable to secure the necessary financial support from the Maladzyechna Raion administration (who decided to fully support Underdog instead) and were forced to give up the promotion. Underdog Chist, however, were also excluded a few weeks later due to financial problems of their own, and the league was left with only 14 participants for the season.

As a result of investigation of match-fixing incidents during 2017 and 2018 seasons, five clubs were punished with points deductions before the start of the season.

Teams summary

League table

Results

Promotion play-offs

First leg

Second leg

Slutsk won 4–1 on aggregate and therefore both clubs remain in their respective leagues.

Relegation play-offs

First leg

Second leg

Khimik Svetlogorsk won 4–0 on aggregate and therefore both clubs remain in their respective leagues.

Top goalscorers

Updated to games played on 21 November 2020 Source: football.by

See also
2020 Belarusian Premier League
2020 Belarusian Second League
2019–20 Belarusian Cup
2020–21 Belarusian Cup

References

External links
 Official site 

Belarusian First League seasons
2
Belarus
Belarus